Zikirti or Zikirtu, (also: Zikirta, Zikurti, Zekertu) was an ancient kingdom (750-521 BC), in the north of the Zagros Mountains, which comprised the easternmost part of Greater Mannae. Geographically it corresponds with the modern counties of Takab and Shahin Dezh in northwestern Iran.
Former kingdoms

See also
Urartians

References

Geography of Iran